The 2017–18 Central Connecticut Blue Devils men's basketball team represented Central Connecticut State University during the 2017–18 NCAA Division I men's basketball season. The Blue Devils, led by second-year head coach Donyell Marshall, played their home games at the William H. Detrick Gymnasium in New Britain, Connecticut as members of the Northeast Conference. They finished the season 14–18, 7–11 in NEC play to finish in eight place. They lost in the first round of the NEC tournament to Wagner.

Previous season 
The Blue Devils finished the 2016–17 season 6–23, 4–14 in NEC play to finish in ninth place. They failed to qualify for the NEC tournament.

Preseason 
In a poll of league coaches at the NEC media day, the Blue Devils were picked to finish in ninth place.

Roster

Schedule and results

|-
!colspan=9 style=| Exhibition
  
|-
!colspan=9 style=| Non-conference regular season

   
|-
!colspan=9 style=| NEC regular season    

      

  

 

|-
!colspan=9 style=|NEC tournament

References

Central Connecticut Blue Devils men's basketball seasons
Central Connecticut
Central Connecticut Blue Devils men's basketball
Central Connecticut Blue Devils men's basketball